The Independent Loyal Orange Institution is an offshoot of the Orange Institution, a Protestant fraternal organisation based in Northern Ireland. Initially pro-labour and supportive of tenant rights and land reform, over time it moved to a more conservative, unionist position.

Foundation

It was formed in Ireland in 1903 by Tom Sloan and others associated with the Belfast Protestant Association who had been expelled from the Orange Order when they voiced opposition to it being used for party political ends by Ulster Unionist Party. Originally it was associated with the labour movement, but it soon realigned itself with traditional unionist politics.

The class tensions within the Orange Order flared into rebellion in 1902. At an unruly Belfast County demonstration in Castlereagh, Thomas Sloan, Worshipful Master of the Belfast Protestant Association, challenged the County Grand Master, Colonel Saunderson MP, to say how he voted on the 'Inspection of Convent Laundries' bill. As the title suggests, this piece of legislation was an attempt to embarrass and annoy the Catholic Church by requiring that its convents (which militant Protestants suspected of exploiting the labour and the sexuality of young girls) be subject to government inspection. The point Sloan wished to make was that Saunderson, like most Unionist leaders, had put government interest before anti-Catholic principle. Although popular enough to win the Belfast South Westminster seat previously held by Willian Johnston of Ballykilbegs (a Protestant hero since his prison sentence in 1867 for defying a parades ban) Sloan was disciplined by Grand Lodge for embarrassing a grandee and led a breakaway.

The organisation enjoyed steady growth, mainly confined to working-class Belfast and the liberal, pro-tenant right redoubt of north Antrim. By early 1904, it claimed nine lodges in Ballymoney alone. The organisation peaked at 44 lodges in 1907.

As Grand Master from 1905, Robert Lindsay Crawford sought to promote the Independent order as "strongly Protestant, strongly democratic" and "strongly Irish". In the Order's 1904 Magheramorne Manifesto, he invited  Irish Protestants to "reconsider their position as Irish citizens and their attitude towards their Roman Catholic countrymen". Ultimately, Crawford's move toward an embrace for Irish Home Rule led to a break with Sloan and the Order's more determined unionist membership. He was expelled in 1908.

In the great Belfast Dock strike of 1907, the labour leader James Larkin was able to engage the support of Sloan and the independent Order. In 1903, Sloan had been the only Unionist MP to vote for the Miners' Eight Hour bill.

Activities

Like the Orange Order it is a Protestant fraternal organisation dedicated to the principles of the Protestant Reformation. It takes its name in memory of King William of Orange of the house of Orange who fought at the Battle of the Boyne, brought about the Glorious Revolution and the Bill of Rights giving the Westminster parliament ultimate power of the country rather than the Monarch. The Independent Order is small compared to the main organisation with about 350–400 members. It is largely based around north County Antrim in Northern Ireland but has lodges around the world, including England, Scotland and Australia. Its annual main Twelfth of July demonstration is held in a north Antrim town or village.

Along with the Orange Order and the Royal Black Institution, the Independent Orange Order in 2006 held talks with the Social Democratic and Labour Party, the Democratic Unionist Party (DUP), the Ulster Unionist Party, Alliance, the Chief Constable of the PSNI, the Secretary of State for Northern Ireland, the Presbyterian and Methodist Churches, the Church of Ireland and the Northern Ireland Human Rights Commission to try to resolve issues around contested loyalist parades. The Independent Orange Order was represented by Free Presbyterian minister David McConaghie, then a prominent figure in both the DUP and the Caleb Foundation, an evangelical pressure group. There was no meeting with Sinn Féin; McConaghie called on the IRA to apologise for the "slaughter" of 310 Orangemen who had been killed during the Troubles.

The annual Independent Orange Order demonstration on the Twelfth of July was in the past usually been addressed by Ian Paisley, the leader of the Democratic Unionist Party, although he was not a member. In 2012, the demonstration held in Rasharkin, County Antrim, was led by McConaghie.

Beliefs

The first notable effect after the formation of the Independent Order was a more liberal interpretation of the rules of the "old order." In the early years of the Institution many suffered the full wrath of the "powers that be", who were opposed to any splitting of the Orange Order. Jobs were lost, homes were burnt and their headquarters in Belfast bombed. Independent Orangemen believe that while the "Old" Order maintains what they see as its totalitarian laws, its political affiliation, and its "spiritual weakness", the "principles of the Reformation" will not be kept to the fore in its ranks.

Independent Orangeism today maintains that it is essential for the Orange Institution to be kept free from politics and to guard the principles of Reformation Protestantism. They often expressed alarm when they believed these principles were endangered by conciliatory politicians. They are opposed to ecumenism.
While being opposed to Orangeism being linked to the Ulster Unionist Party they are not apolitical and tend to work alongside unionist politicians and parties.

The structure and size of the Order lends itself to good communication and disciplined action based on that communication. Thus they have been able to participate in strikes, days of action, and parade protests. On occasions lodges have been given area responsibility as part of an overall co-ordinated, disciplined and peaceful protest action.

The Institution also promotes Ulster Protestant history. This is most obvious during the Twelfth and other parades, but also involves lectures, tours of historic sites and commemorative publications.

The Institution proclaims the principle of "Liberty of Conscience". They declare their right to think and act independently without direction from political or clerical masters. They seek to strengthen the position of Orangeism. They often warn of the danger of the development of a social and cultural Orangeism devoid of Protestant principle.

They claim the support of all Protestants with their slogan:
Protestantism, not politics
Principles, not party 
Measures, not men
Independent Orangemen believe that Protestantism is the religion of the Bible and the foundation of modern democracy.

Degrees

The Independent Orange Institution possesses 3 degrees – the Orange, Plain Purple and the highly ritualistic Royal Arch Purple. The layout of the Independent Orange Institution degree system is outlined in the Independent Loyal Orange Institution 'candidate instruction' booklet which states: "There are three degrees in the Institution, the first being the Orange...Upon receipt of the Plain Purple degree a member is entitled to hold office in his Private Lodge and to attend the meetings of District. The Royal Arch Purple degree is the longest and most detailed degree. A member who receives this degree can attend County and Imperial Grand Lodge meetings."

This degree, worked within the Independent Orange, is in essence the same as that employed by the Royal Arch Purple Chapter, although like any distinct organisation it has some slight differences.

References

External links 
 Independent Loyal Orange Institution
 County Grand Lodge of Merseyside
 Grand Orange Lodge of Canada
 Evangelical Truth

1903 establishments in Ireland
Protestantism in the United Kingdom
Irish culture
Orange Order
Ulster unionist organisations
Irish secret societies